Peni Tuigulagula (born 8 March 1999) is a Fijian footballer who plays as a defender for Australian club Frankston Pines and the Fiji national team.

Club career
Tuigulagula came through the youth ranks of Nadi. In 2018 he made his debut for the first team. In 2020 he moved, together with fellow countrymens Tito Vodowaqa, Savenaca Baledrokadroka and Asaeli Batikasa to the Australian based club Frankston Pines.

National team
In 2019 Tuigulagula was called up by coach Christophe Gamel for the Fiji national football team. He made his debut on March 18, 2019, in a 3–0 win against New Caledonia. He came in for Nicholas Prasad in the 85th minute of play.
In 2019, he was selected for the 2019 Pacific Games. Fiji won a bronze medal.

References

External links
 

Fijian footballers
Association football forwards
Nadi F.C. players
Fiji international footballers
Living people
1999 births